There were 4 special elections in 1975 to the United States House of Representatives:

List of elections 

Elections are listed by date and district.

|-
! 
| John Rarick
|  | Democratic
| November 8, 1966
|  | Court ordered re-run of the General Election. New member elected January 7, 1975.Republican gain.Winner was subsequently re-elected in November.
| nowrap | 

|-
! 
| Jerry Pettis
|  | Republican
| November 8, 1966
|  | Incumbent died February 14, 1975. New member elected April 29, 1975.Republican hold.Winner was subsequently re-elected in November.
| nowrap | 

|-
! 
| John C. Kluczynski
|  | Democratic
| November 7, 1950
|  | Incumbent died January 26, 1975. New member elected July 8, 1975.Democratic hold.Winner was subsequently re-elected in November.
| nowrap | 

|-
! 
| Richard Fulton
|  | Democratic
| November 6, 1962
|  |  Resigned August 14, 1975, after being elected Mayor of Nashville New member elected November 25, 1975.Democratic hold.
| nowrap | 

|}

References

 
1975